Rafael Castillo may refer to:
Rafael C. Castillo, American academic
Rafael Castillo Valdez (1928–2015), Guatemalan politician and ambassador
Rafael Castillo (footballer) (born 1980), Colombian football midfielder
Rafael Castillo (football manager) (born 1960), Peruvian manager
Rafael Castillo (taekwondo) (born 1993), Cuban taekwondo athlete
Rafael Castillo, Buenos Aires, a district of La Matanza Partido, Buenos Aires Province, Argentina

Castillo, Rafael